Mechmont is a commune in the Lot département in south-western France.

Population

See also
Communes of the Lot department

References

Communes of Lot (department)